The 1898 Haskell Indians football team was an American football team that represented the Haskell Indian Institute (now known as Haskell Indian Nations University) as an independent during the 1898 college football season. The team compiled a 2–7 record and failed to score a point in six of its nine games. Sal Walker was the coach. The team played no home games.

Schedule

References

Haskell
Haskell Indian Nations Fighting Indians football seasons
Haskell Indians football